Alaska Airlines operates a mainline fleet consisting of primarily Boeing 737 series aircraft and a regional fleet operated with Alaska branded Embraer 175 jets by the Alaska-owned regional airline Horizon Air and contractor SkyWest Airlines.

Alaska Airlines operated with an all-Boeing 737 mainline fleet from August 25, 2008, until January 11, 2018, at which time Alaska officially merged with Virgin America and took possession of its fleet of Airbus aircraft. The airline is working to return to operating an all-Boeing 737 mainline fleet, with the transition expected to be complete by the end of 2023.

The current cargo fleet consists of three Boeing 737-700 freighter jets that were formerly passenger aircraft.

Current fleet 

, Alaska Airlines operates the following aircraft:

Fleet history 

Since the 1960s, Alaska has consistently operated Boeing jet aircraft in its fleet although the first jetliner type operated by the airline was the Convair 880. Alaska also operated the Convair 990 jetliner. Besides the current Boeing 737 models flown by Alaska, the airline previously operated Boeing 707, Boeing 720 and Boeing 720B four-engine jets as well as the three-engine Boeing 727-100 and 727-200, and the twin-engine 737-200, 737-400 and Airbus A319 and A320. The last 727 was retired in May 1994.

In the 1980s, Alaska began acquiring McDonnell Douglas MD-80s. Alaska acquired additional MD-80s via the acquisition of Jet America Airlines in 1987. Alaska was the launch customer for the MD-83 and took delivery of the first airplanes in 1985. Alaska continued to take delivery of new MD-83s during the 1990s, both to meet the demands of a growing route system and to retire its aging and fuel-inefficient 727 fleet. In 2005, due to the greater efficiency of the Boeing 737 Next Generation and rising costs for maintenance, fuel and crew training, Alaska Airlines decided to phase out the remaining 26 MD-80s and trained the pilots to fly the newer 737-800s that were being ordered to replace them. The last MD-80 flights took place on August 25, 2008.

Alaska also used eight Boeing 737–200 Combi/QCs to suit the unique needs of flying in the state of Alaska. These combi aircraft operated with a mixed load of passengers and freight on the main deck were valued for their ability to be rapidly reconfigured (hence the moniker QC or "Quick Change") to match the specific cargo and passenger loads for any given flight. In the all-freight configuration, the 737-200 Combis carried up to six cargo containers, known as "igloos." The palletized floor allowed for passenger seating to range from 26 to 72 seats. The 737-200s were also gravel-kitted, which allowed them to be used at airports such as Red Dog, which formerly featured a gravel runway. Alaska replaced the 737-200s with six reconfigured 737-400s between 2006 and 2007. Five featured a mixed cargo/passenger Combi arrangement, and one was a freighter carrying only cargo. Unlike the 737-200 Combi, the 737-400 Combis featured a fixed seating capacity of 72 seats. The last 737-200 Combi (short for combination) was retired in 2007 and is now displayed at the Alaska Aviation Museum. The 737-400 Combi aircraft were retired in October 2017. Alaska Airlines also retired their passenger 737-400s in March 2018, at the time it was the last major airline operating the 737 Classic.

The current cargo fleet consists of three Boeing 737-700 freighter jets that were formerly passenger aircraft and converted to cargo aircraft over 19 months in 2016 and 2017 by Israel Aerospace Industries. By the end of 2023, Alaska Air Cargo plans to add an additional three 737-800 freighters to be converted by Boeing, from Alaska's existing fleet. Because the -800 can carry 40% more cargo than the -700, the aircraft will nearly double Alaska Air Cargo's available capacity.

After Alaska merged with Virgin America on January 11, 2018, it took possession of its fleet of Airbus aircraft. Over time, the airline slowly removed the Airbus jets from its fleet. All ten Airbus A319 jets were taken out of service in mid-2020 due to insufficient demand and low-profit margins due to the COVID-19 pandemic. The fleet of 53 A320 jets was slowly removed from service as leases expired and new 737 were purchased, with the final jet going out of service on January 10, 2023. The airline's ten remaining Airbus A321neo jets are scheduled to be removed from service by the end of 2023.

On January 24, 2021, Alaska Airlines took delivery of its first 737 MAX 9, registered N913AK.

On January 26, 2023, Alaska Horizon operated their last Dash 8-Q400 flight.

Livery 
The airline's livery and logo have remained remarkably similar for the last 50 years; with the word Alaska on the front sides of the fuselage, with an image of a native Alaskan Eskimo on the vertical stabilizer as a logo.

The image of the Eskimo first appeared in 1972 alongside three other images that each represented a part of Alaska's history: a totem pole, a gold miner, and Russian spires. The Eskimo is depicted wearing a traditional qulittaq (parka with ruff). In 1976, the airline adopted the Eskimo tail fleet-wide, with the design slightly changed to have the face smiling.

Between the 1970s and the mid-2010s, Alaska's aircraft were painted all white (except for the image on the tail), with dark blue and teal stripes running the length of the sides of the fuselage. Between 1976 and 1990, the stripes were placed above and below the windows, with a simple, small "Alaska" text at the front of the plane. In 1990, the stripes were moved to the "belt line" of the plane, and the word "Alaska" was depicted as a wordmark with the letters designed to look like icicles. Starting in February 2015, Alaska rolled out an updated or "refreshed" livery. The changes included a simplified wordmark, stripes in a lighter shade of blue and darker green, and a simplified Eskimo design on the tail (no teal outline).

In January 2016, the livery and logo received a major redesign. The Alaska wordmark was further streamlined and the design of the Eskimo logo was simplified and the ruffs on the parka were made more colorful. On the fuselage of planes, the stripes were eliminated and replaced by a "jelly bean" design with waves of dark blue, navy blue, teal, and green running up the side of the plane to the vertical stabilizer.

References

External links 

 Our Aircraft – Alaska Airlines

Alaska Air Group
Lists of aircraft by operator